Peter Solomon may refer to:

Peter Solomon (baseball) (born 1996), American baseball player
Peter Solomon (The Lost Symbol), a character in the novel, The Lost Symbol
Peter J. Solomon Company, an investment banking advisory firm
Peter Solomon, designer of The Handle, an electric guitar